Anson Wong Ho Chun (born 2 April 2002) is a Hong Kong professional footballer who currently plays as a midfielder for Hong Kong Premier League club Eastern.

Club career

Lee Man 
On 30 June 2020, Wong joined Lee Man.

Eastern 
On 4 August 2022, Wong joined Eastern Sports Club. Wong said that Eastern's coach, Roberto Losada, had previously invited him to join Eastern and on seeing senior footballers, such as Yapp Hung Fai and Leung Chun Pong, who had helped young footballers progress in Eastern, decided to join the club.

References

External links
 HKFA

2002 births
Living people
Hong Kong footballers
Association football midfielders
South China AA players
Lee Man FC players
Eastern Sports Club footballers
Hong Kong First Division League players
Hong Kong Premier League players